Marsha P. Johnson State Park (formerly and also known as East River State Park) is an  state park in the Williamsburg neighborhood of Brooklyn, New York. The park stretches along the East River near North 7th, 8th, and 9th Streets, with views of the Williamsburg Bridge and Midtown Manhattan. 

East River State Park opened in 2007 on the site of the Brooklyn Eastern District Terminal. The park was renamed in honor of gay rights activist Marsha P. Johnson in 2020, becoming the first New York state park to be named after an LGBTQ person.

History
Marsha P. Johnson State Park is built on the former site of the Brooklyn Eastern District Terminal, the first offline railroad terminal to be located in Brooklyn (opened in 1870 as Palmer's Dock). It is adjacent to the city-run Bushwick Inlet Park. The park opened on May 26, 2007, and was originally known as East River State Park. Unlike other nearby parks, it closes at dusk. State park rules prohibit dogs and bicycle riding.

In 2009, the music concerts that were held at the McCarren Park Pool were relocated to the East River State Park. The Open Space Alliance for North Brooklyn (OSA) selected the East River State Park as the site for future performances. The park has been nicknamed the Williamsburg Waterfront. Through a public/private partnership the Open Space Alliance and Ticketmaster, live music performances will be held through the summer months at the East River State Park.

Renaming and renovation
On February 1, 2020, Governor Andrew Cuomo of New York announced that the East River State Park in Brooklyn would be renamed in honor of gay rights activist Marsha P. Johnson. New York state governor Andrew Cuomo formally rededicated the park on August 24, 2020, on the 75th anniversary of Johnson's birth. At the renaming, Cuomo also announced the addition of art and signage within the park that would reflect Johnson's work. The state government closed parts of the park in early 2021, adding trees, paths, gardens, and event spaces as part of a renovation. The state originally planned to commission a mural honoring Johnson, but these plans were scrapped in mid-2021 after community members and activists criticized the lack of public input for the plans.

In August 2022, on the 77th anniversary of Johnson's birth, governor Kathy Hochul announced that a new gate to the park would be constructed as part of a renovation. The gateway would contain floral decorations, which Johnson frequently wore, and the words "Pay it no mind", which Johnson sardonically said was what her middle initial stood for.

Gallery

See also 
 List of New York state parks
 List of parks in New York City

References

External links 

New York State Parks: Marsha P. Johnson State Park
Brooklyn Eastern District Terminal, Palmer's Dock - A Comprehensive History: 1870-1983

State parks of New York (state)
Parks in Brooklyn
East River
Williamsburg, Brooklyn
Protected areas established in 2007
2007 establishments in New York City
LGBT monuments and memorials in the United States